The Richmond Pioneers were a minor league baseball team that played in the Class-D Blue Grass League from 1908 to 1912. They were based in Richmond, Kentucky, USA.

Multiple Major League Baseball players played for the Pioneers. They include Roy Golden, Ed Glenn, Marty Krug, Emil Huhn, Mack Allison, Raymond Haley, Jim Park, and Jim Jones.

References

1908 establishments in Kentucky
1912 disestablishments in Kentucky
Baseball teams established in 1908
Baseball teams disestablished in 1912
Defunct baseball teams in Kentucky
Defunct minor league baseball teams
Blue Grass League teams
Richmond, Kentucky